Löbau (Upper Sorbian: Lubij) is a city in the east of Saxony, Germany, in the traditional region of Upper Lusatia. It is situated between the slopes of the Löbauer Berg and the fertile hilly area of the Upper Lusatian Mountains. It is the gateway to this volcanic mountainous area and is situated halfway between the cities of Bautzen, Görlitz and Zittau.

History
Löbau was first mentioned in 1221 as "Oppidum Lubaw". During the Middle Ages the city was a member of the Lusatian League, consisting of the six cities Bautzen, Görlitz, Kamenz, Lauban, Löbau and Zittau. The regional alliance was first established in 1346 and disbanded in 1815. The league was revived in 1991, though it no longer holds political power and mostly acts as a tourism promotion board.

The town is widely known for the piano manufacturing company August Förster.

Main sights
The town hall of the city is a noteworthy mixture of several architectural styles. Another famous building is the Schminke House by German architect Hans Scharoun, one of the most important exponents of organic and expressionist architecture. The building dates from the 1930s, anticipating the architecture of the 1950s. It is regarded as one of Scharoun's greatest works.

The King Frederick Augustus Tower is Löbau's main landmark; the tower made of cast iron was built in 1854 on the Löbauer Berg, and is 28 m tall. It is the biggest cast-iron tower in Europe and offers magnificent views of the Lusatian Highlands.

Politics

Reichstag Deputies

Following the North German Confederation Treaty the Kingdom of Saxony entered the North German Confederation in 1866. This continued after the founding of the German Empire on 18 January 1871. Following this Saxony participated in Reichstag elections from February 1867. Löbau returned a series of Reichstag Deputies until 1919 when the existing constituencies were scrapped.

International relations

Twin towns — Sister cities
Löbau is twinned with:
 Makó, Hungary
 Ettlingen, Germany
 Luban, Poland

People
 August Förster (1829-1897), piano maker
 Marie Wackwitz (1865-1930), women's rights activist
 Georg Scholze (1897-1945), general during World War II
 Konrad Kujau (1938-2000), forger
 Bernd Böhlich (*1957), director
 Uwe Proske (*1961), Olympic gold medalist (1992, fencing)
 Anne-Kathrin Schade (*1968), volleyball player
 Jana Henke (*1973), swimmer
 Mirko Müller (*1974), pair skater
 René Münnich (*1977), auto racing driver and team owner
 Robert Koch (*1986), footballer (formerly Dynamo Dresden, 1. FC Nürnberg)
 Christian Reitz (*1987), Olympic gold medalist (2016, 25 metre rapid fire pistol) and world record holder

References

External links 
 Official website of the city of Löbau (German)
Homepage of the Schminke House
Homepage of the modern Lusatian League (German)

 
Towns in Görlitz (district)